Sinapine is an alkaloidal amine found in some seeds, particularly oil seeds of plants in the family Brassicaceae. It is the choline ester of sinapic acid.

Sinapine was discovered by Etienne Ossian Henry in 1825.

Occurrence
Sinapine typically occurs in the outer seed coat of oil crops and is plentiful in some types of press cake leftover after vegetable oil extraction. Typical oil seed cake residues high in sinapine include Brassica juncea (1.22% by mass), and rapeseed (0.39-1.06% by mass).

Isolation
The typical protocol for extracting Sinapine from seed cakes entails defatting the cake with hexane via a Soxhlet apparatus followed by extraction with 70% methanol held at 75 °C.

Metabolism 
Sinapine esterase is an enzyme whose two substrates are sinapine and H2O and whose two products are sinapic acid and choline.

Sinapoylglucose—choline O-sinapoyltransferase is an enzyme whose two substrates are 1-O-sinapoyl-β-D-glucose and choline, whereas its two products are D-glucose and sinapine.

See also 

Phenolic content in wine
Syringaldehyde
Syringol
Syringic acid
Acetosyringone
Sinapyl alcohol
Sinapinic acid
Sinapaldehyde
Canolol

References 

Alkaloids
Quaternary ammonium compounds
Hydroxycinnamic acid esters
O-methylated hydroxycinnamic acids
Vinylogous carboxylic acids
Resorcinol ethers